The Count Fleet Stakes is an American Thoroughbred horse race run at Aqueduct Racetrack, located in Jamaica, New York, at the beginning of January each year.  It is the first stakes race of the year run in New York City for three-year-olds.

Named after Count Fleet, the 1943 Triple Crown winner, the race is open to three-year-olds willing to race one mile and seventy yards on the inner dirt track.

Offering a purse of $65,000 added, the race is a prep to the Whirlaway Stakes, the Gotham Stakes, the Bay Shore Stakes and the Wood Memorial Stakes.

Inaugurated in 1975 as the Count Fleet Handicap at Belmont Park, it was run that year at a distance of one mile.  In 1976 it was raced at seven furlongs then from 1977 through 1983 at a mile and a sixteenth. It has been contested at a mile and seventy yards since 1984.

There was no race run in 1982.

Records
Speed record: (at current distance of 1 mile, 70 yards)
 1:39.61 – Achilles of Troy (2006)
Most wins by a jockey:
 3 – Jorge Velásquez (1975, 1984, 1990)
 3 – Richard Migliore (1985, 1988, 2002)

Most wins by a trainer:
 2 – John P. Campo (1977, 1991)

Most wins by an owner:
 2 – Paraneck Stable (2006, 2007)

Winners

 † In 1991, Stately Wager finished first but was disqualified to second.

References

Triple Crown Prep Races
Horse races in New York (state)
1975 establishments in New York (state)
Flat horse races for three-year-olds
Ungraded stakes races in the United States
Recurring sporting events established in 1975
Aqueduct Racetrack